Expert Imaging and Sound Association is a collaboration between different multimedia magazines, that offer tests of cameras, videocameras, audio equipment, mobile phones, etc. The organization was established in 1982. The current president of EISA is Paul Miller.

In 2018, the organisation was renamed as the Expert Imaging and Sound Association (formerly European Imaging and Sound Association) to reflect new members from outside the European area, including Australian magazines Sound+Image and Australian Hi-Fi, and US magazines Stereophile and Sound and Vision.

External links 
 EISA

Organizations established in 1982
Pan-European trade and professional organizations
1982 establishments in Europe